The Australian Minister for Small Business is the Hon Julie Collins MP. 

In the Government of Australia, the Minister administers their portfolio through the Department of the Treasury.

List of Minister for Small Business

The following individuals have been appointed as Minister for Small Business, or any precedent titles:

References

External links
 

Small Business
Business in Australia